Under the controversy of person–situation debate, situationism is the theory that changes in human behavior are factors of the situation rather than the traits a person possesses. Behavior is believed to be influenced by external, situational factors rather than internal traits or motivations. Situationism therefore challenges the positions of trait theorists, such as Hans Eysenck or Raymond B. Cattell. This is an ongoing debate that has truth to both sides; psychologists are able to prove each of the view points through human experimentation.

History and conceptions
Situationists believe that thoughts, feelings, dispositions, and past experiences and behaviors do not determine what someone will do in a given situation, rather, the situation itself does. 
Situationists tend to assume that character traits are distinctive, meaning that they do not completely disregard the idea of traits, but suggest that situations have a greater impact on behavior than those traits. Situationism is also influenced by culture, in that the extent to which people believe that situations impact behaviors varies between cultures. Situationism has been perceived as arising in response to trait theories, and correcting the notion that everything we do is because of our traits. However, situationism has also been criticized for ignoring individuals' inherent influences on behavior. There are many experiments and evidence supporting this topic, and shown in the sources below but also in the article itself. But these experiments do not test what people would do in situations that are forced or rushed, most mistakes are made from rushing and or forgetting something due to lack of concentration. Situationism can be looked at in many different ways, this means that situationism needs to be tested and experimented in many different ways.

Experimental evidence

Evidence for
Many studies have found evidence supporting situationism. One notable situationist study is Zimbardo's Stanford prison experiment. This study was considered one of the most unethical because the participants were deceived and were physically and psychologically abused. The goal of the study was that Zimbardo wanted to discover two things. If prison guards abused prisoners because of their nature, or because of the power they were given in the situation. They also wanted to figure out if prisoners acted violent because of their nature or because of being in a secluded and violent environment. To carry out this experiment, Zimbardo gathered 24 college men and paid them 15 dollars an hour to live two weeks in a mock prison. The participants were told that they were chosen to be guard or prisoner because of their personality traits, but they were randomly selected. The prisoners were booked and given prison clothes and no possessions. They were also assigned a number to be referred to with the intent of farther dehumanizing them. Within the first night, the prisoner and guard dynamics began to take place. The guards started waking up the prisoners in the middle of the night for count, and they would yell and ridicule them. The prisoners also started developing hostile traits against the guards and having prison related conversations. By the second day, the guards started abusing the prisoners by forcing them to do push ups, and the prisoners started rebelling by removing their caps and numbers, and hiding in their cells with their mattresses blocking the door. As the days passed the relationship between the guards and prisoners became extremely hostile- the prisoners fought for their independence, and the guards fought to strip them of it.

There were many cases where the prisoners began breaking down psychologically, and it all started with prisoner 8612. After one day after the experiment started, prisoner number 8612 has anxiety attacks and asked to leave. He was then told "You can't leave. You can't quit.” He then went back to the prison and “began to act ‘crazy,’ to scream, to curse, to go into a rage that seemed out of control.”  After this, he was sent home. The other prisoner that broke down was 819. 819 had broken down and was told to rest in a room. When Dr.Zimbardo went to check on him he said " what I found was a boy crying hysterically while in the background his fellow prisoners were yelling and chanting that he was a bad prisoner, that they were being punished because of him." Zimbardo then allowed him to leave but he said he couldn't because he was labeled as a bad prisoner, to which Zimbardo responded "Listen, you are not 819. My name is Dr. Zimbardo, I am a psychologist, and this is not a prison. This is just an experiment and those are students, just like you. Let's go." He stopped crying suddenly and looked up at me just like a small child awakened from a nightmare and said, "OK, let's go."

The guards also began to have extremely abusive relations with the prisoners. Zimbardo claimed there were three types of guards. The first were the guards that followed all the rules but got the job done, the second felt bad for the prisoners, and the third were extremely hostile and treated them like animals. This last type showed behaviors of actual guards and seemed to have forgotten they were college students, they got into their roles faster, and seemed to enjoy tormenting the prisoners. On Thursday night, 6 days into the experiment, Zimbardo described the guards as having "sadistic" behavior, and then decided to close down the study early.

This study showed how regular people can completely disassociate with who they are when their environment changes. Regular college boys turned into broken down prisoners and sadistic guards.

Studies investigating bystander effects also support situationism. For example, in 1973, Darley and Batson conducted a study where they asked students at a seminary school to give a presentation in a separate building. They gave each individual participant a topic, and would then tell a participant that they were supposed to be there immediately, or in a few minutes, and sent them on their way to the building. On the way, each participant encountered a confederate who was on the ground, clearly in need of medical attention. Darley and Batson observed that more participants who had extra time stopped to help the confederate than those who were in a hurry. Helping was not predicted by religious personality measures, and the results therefore indicate that the situation influenced their behavior.

A third well-known study supporting situationism is an obedience study, the Milgram experiment. Stanley Milgram made his obedience study to explain the obedience phenomenon, specifically the holocaust. He wanted to explain how people follow orders, and how people are likely to do unmoral things when ordered to by people of authority. The way the experiment was devised was that Milgram picked 40 men from a newspaper add to take part in a study at Yale University. The men were between 20 and 50 years old, and were paid $4.50 for showing up. In this study, a participant was assigned to be a "teacher" and a confederate was assigned to be a "learner". The teachers were told the learners had to memorize word pairs, and every time they got it wrong they were shocked with increasing voltages. The voltages ranged from 15 to 450, and in order for the participants to believe the shock was real, the experimenters administered to them a real 45v shock, The participant was unaware that the learner was a confederate. The participant would test the learner, and for each incorrect answer the learner gave, the participant would have to shock the learner with increasing voltages. The shocks were not actually administered, but the participant believed they were. When the shocks reached 300v, the learner began to protest and show discomfort. Milgram expected participants to stop the procedure, but 65% of them continued to completion, administering shocks that could have been fatal, even if they were uncomfortable or upset. Even though most of the participants continued administering the shocks, they had distressed reactions when administering the shocks, such as laughing hysterically. Participants felt compelled to listen to the experimenter, who was the authority figure present in the room and continued to encourage the participant throughout the study. Out of 40 participants, 26 went all the way to the end.

Evidence against

Personality traits have a very weak relationship to behavior. In contrast, situational factors usually have a stronger impact on behavior; this is the core evidence for situationism. In addition, people are also able to describe character traits of close to such as friends and family, which goes to show that there are opposing reasons showing why people can recall these traits.

In addition, there are other studies that show these same trends. For example, twin studies have shown that identical twins share more traits than fraternal twins. This also implies that there is a genetic basis for behavior, which directly contradicts situationist views that behavior is determined by the situation. When observing one instance of extroverted or honest behavior, it shows how in different situations a person would behave in a similarly honest or extroverted way. It shows that when many people are observed in a range of situations the trait-related reactions to behavior is about .20 or less. People think the correlation is around .80. This shows that the situation itself is more dependent on characteristics and circumstances in contrast to what is taking place at that point in time.

These recent challenges to the Traditional View have not gone unnoticed. Some have attempted to modify the Traditional View to insulate it from these challenges, while others have tried to show how these challenges fail to undermine the Traditional View at all. For example, Dana Nelkin (2005), Christian Miller (2003), Gopal Sreenivasan (2002), and John Sabini and Maury Silver (2005), among others, have argued that the empirical evidence cited by the Situationists does not show that individuals lack robust character traits.

Current views: interactionism
In addition to the debate between trait influences and situational influences on behavior, a psychological model of "interactionism" exists, which is a view that both internal dispositions and external situational factors affect a person's behavior in a given situation. This model emphasizes both sides of the person-situation debate, and says that internal and external factors interact with each other to produce a behavior. Interactionism is currently an accepted personality theory, and there has been sufficient empirical evidence to support interactionism. However, it is also important to note that both situationists and trait theorists contributed to explaining facets of human behavior.

See also
Trait activation theory
Philip Zimbardo

Notes

Further reading
Krahe, B. (1993) Personality and Social Psychology: Towards a Synthesis. London: Sage.

Personality theories